Vizefeldwebel Friedrich Ehmann was a German World War I flying ace credited with eight confirmed aerial victories. Possibly, two of his victims were enemy aces: Richard Minifie and Robert A. Little, though it cannot be confirmed. Both survived their respective crashes.

Early life
Friedrich Ehmann's birthplace in the Kingdom of Württemberg can be deduced by its custom of awarding their military medals solely to their own citizens.

World War I
Ehmann first comes to history's notice when he flew for Kest 5 from 22 October to 25 December 1917. During this time, he claimed his first aerial victory, which went unconfirmed.

He then transferred to an established fighter squadron, Jasta 47. Ehmann's second confirmed victory was over one of the leading Royal Naval Air Service aces, Richard Minifie, who had 21 victories. Minifie, who belonged to 1 Naval Squadron, came down unwounded on 17 March 1918, but sat out the remainder of the fighting as a prisoner of war.

On 21 April 1918, Ehmann downed his second enemy ace, Robert A. Little, who was the leading Australian ace of the war, scoring the majority of his wins in a RNAS Sopwith Triplane, shot down one of Ehmann's squadronmates. When Ehmann, in turn, shot Little down, he crashlanded unhurt behind British lines. Little reported the cause of his downing as a shattered main spar and bullet-riddled controls.

Ehmann was awarded Württemberg's Military Merit Order on 18 October 1918. He was also awarded the Iron Cross First Class.

List of aerial victories
See also Aerial victory standards of World War I

Official victories are numbered and listed chronologically. Unconfirmed victories are denoted by "u/c" and may or may not be listed by date.

Post World War I
Ehmann is known to have survived World War I.

References
 Franks, Norman, Frank W. Bailey, and Russell Guest (1993). Above the Lines: The Aces and Fighter Units of the German Air Service, Naval Air Service and Flanders Marine Corps, 1914-1918. Grub Street Publishing. , .
 Pfalz Scout Aces of World War 1: Volume 71 of Aircraft of the Aces. Greg Vanwyngarden. Osprey Publishing, 2006. , .

Endnotes

German World War I flying aces
Year of death unknown
Year of birth missing
Recipients of the Iron Cross (1914), 1st class
Luftstreitkräfte personnel